Jamaica competed at the 2011 World Championships in Athletics from August 27 to September 4 in Daegu, South Korea.

Team selection

A team of 51 athletes was
announced to represent the country
in the event.  The team is led by Olympic gold medalists and defending or
former world champions Usain Bolt, 	Melaine Walker, Shelly-Ann Fraser-Pryce, and Veronica Campbell-Brown.  Because only the names of the athletes were published, the assignment of athletes to events is tentatively due to this year's performances.  Publication of the entry list solves this problem.

The following athletes appeared on the preliminary Entry List, but not on the Official Start List of the specific event, resulting in a total number of 45 competitors:

Medalists
The following competitors from Jamaica won medals at the Championships

Results

Men

Decathlon

Women

References

External links
Official local organising committee website
Official IAAF competition website

Nations at the 2011 World Championships in Athletics
World Championships in Athletics
Jamaica at the World Championships in Athletics